

Denmark
Danish West Indies – Peter Carl Frederik von Scholten, Governor-General of the Danish West Indies (1827–1848) 
South Greenland – Carl Peter Holbøll, Inspector of South Greenland (1828–1856)

Portugal
Angola – Pedro Alexandrino da Cunha, Governor-General of Angola (1845–1848)

United Kingdom
Malta Colony
Patrick Stuart, Governor of Malta (1843–1847)
Richard More O'Ferrall, Governor of Malta (1847–1851)
New South Wales – Lieutenant Colonel Charles FitzRoy, Governor of New South Wales (1846–1855)
South Australia – Lieutenant-Colonel Frederick Holt Robe, Governor of South Australia (1845–1848)
Tasmania - Sir William Denison, Governor (1847-1855)
 Western Australia 
 Lieutenant-Colonel Andrew Clarke, Governor of Western Australia (1846–1847)
 Lieutenant-Colonel Frederick Irwin, Acting Governor of Western Australia (1847–1848)

See also
List of state leaders in 1847
List of religious leaders in 1847

Colonial governors
Colonial governors
1847